The 2020 Florida State Seminoles football team represented Florida State University during the 2020 NCAA Division I FBS football season. The Seminoles played their home games at Doak Campbell Stadium in Tallahassee, Florida, and competed as members of the Atlantic Coast Conference. They were led by head coach Mike Norvell, in his first season.

The Seminoles finished the season with a losing record for the third consecutive season for the first time since the 1974–1976 seasons and their worst record since 1975.

Previous season
Florida State finished the 2019 season 6–7, 4–4 in ACC play, to finish in fourth place in the Atlantic Division. The Seminoles appeared in the Sun Bowl, losing to Arizona State, to complete consecutive losing seasons for the first time since the 1975 and 1976 seasons. Willie Taggart was fired prior to the end of the season and Odell Haggins served as interim coach for the remaining games.

Coaching staff

Schedule
 
Florida State had games scheduled against Boise State, Florida, Samford, and West Virginia, which were all canceled due to the COVID-19 pandemic, which resulted in the ACC playing a ten-game conference schedule with one non-conference opponent and reduced stadium capacity. Florida State ended up playing nine games as the result of further cancelations. This was the first season since 1957 that the Seminoles did not play Florida.

The Seminoles were picked to finish in seventh place in the ACC, while Marvin Wilson, Hamsah Nasirildeen, Tamorrion Terry and Asante Samuel, Jr. were selected to the preseason All-ACC team.

The game between Florida State and Duke was originally scheduled to take place on December 5 at Wallace Wade Stadium in Durham, North Carolina. However, due to COVID-19 management requirements in response to positive tests and subsequent quarantine of individuals within the Florida State program which led to the cancelation of the two prior games, the game was rescheduled for December 12 in Tallahassee.
A game between Florida State and Wake Forest was added to the schedule as the result of cancelations of prior games on both teams' schedules due to COVID-19 protocols, as set by the conference. The game was later canceled due to positive tests and contact tracing within the Florida State program that left the team short of the required number of players.

Game summaries

Georgia Tech

In Mike Norvell's debut, the Seminoles fell 16–13 to the Yellow Jackets in their fourth-straight season opening loss and the first win for the Yellow Jackets against the Seminoles in Tallahassee since 2009.

Miami (FL)

On September 19, it was announced that head coach Mike Norvell had tested positive for COVID-19 and would be quarantining as a result. Chris Thomsen, the deputy head coach, handled on-field coaching duties for the game.

The Seminoles fell 52–10 to the Hurricanes to mark their fourth-straight loss in the series and suffering their second largest loss to their rival.

Jacksonville State

The Seminoles overcame an early fourteen-point deficit to defeat the Gamecocks, 41–24, in their lone non-conference game to secure the team's first victory of the season as well as Norvell's first win as head coach.

Notre Dame

Prior to the game, Jordan Travis was named the starter at quarterback, making him the third player to start at the position throughout the first four games of the season.

The Seminoles were beaten by the Irish, 42–26, in their first and only meeting as conference foes.

North Carolina

Entering the game as a double-digit underdog, Florida State built up a twenty-four point halftime lead and survived a second-half rally to defeat the Tar Heels, and alum Mack Brown, by a score of 31–28, giving Mike Norvell his first win over a ranked team as head coach of the Seminoles.

Louisville

The Seminoles were beaten by Louisville, the former school of quarterback Jordan Travis, by a score of 48–16.

Pittsburgh

In only their second meeting since Pittsburgh joined the conference, the Seminoles lost to the Panthers by a score of 41–17, in a game that featured three turnovers by the Florida State offense and seven sacks by the Pitt defense.

NC State

Starting their fourth quarterback of the season due to injury, the Seminoles fell to the Wolfpack, led by former Florida State quarterback Bailey Hockman, by a score of 38–22.

Duke

Playing their first game in nearly a month due to issues pertaining to the pandemic, the Seminoles built up an early lead and survived a comeback attempt to defeat the Blue Devils 56–35 on Senior Day. Jordan Travis broke the school record for rushing yards in a season by a quarterback.

Rankings

Watchlists

Honors

Players drafted into the NFL

References

Florida State
Florida State Seminoles football seasons
Florida State Seminoles football